The Russian Third League 1996 was the 3rd time competition on the fourth level of Russian football was professional. There were 6 zones with 102 teams starting the competition (6 were excluded before the end of the season).

Zone 1

Overview

Standings

Notes.

 FC Uralan-d Elista were excluded from the league after playing 18 games and gaining 23 points. Opponents were awarded a win in the remaining games. They did not play in any national-level competitions in 1997.
 FC Gofrokarton Digora were excluded from the league after playing 29 games and gaining 20 points. Opponents were awarded a win in the remaining games. They played their first professional season. They did not play in any national-level competitions in 1997.
 FC Gekris Anapa renamed to FC Spartak.
 FC Dynamo Makhachkala renamed to FC Dynamo-Imamat.
 FC Kuban-d Krasnodar and PFC Spartak-d Nalchik played their first professional season.
 FC Anzhi-2 Makhachkala moved to Kaspiysk.
 FC Iriston Mozdok renamed to FC Mozdok.
 FC Astrateks Astrakhan and FC Derbent did not play in any national-level competitions in 1997.
 FC Spartak-2 Nartkala renamed to FC Nart.
 FC Kabardey-ZET Nizhny Cherek promoted from the Amateur Football League. They did not play in any national-level competitions in 1997.
 FC Druzhba-d Maykop renamed to FC Kommunalnik-Druzhba-d Maykop. They did not play in any national-level competitions in 1997.

Top goalscorers
23 goals
Gennady Korkin (FC Spartak Anapa)

21 goals
Aleksandr Kamentsev (FC Venets Gulkevichi)

20 goals

  Narvik Sirkhayev (FC Dynamo-Imamat Makhachkala)

19 goals

 Sultan Chochuyev (FC Kabardey-ZET Nizhny Cherek)
 Timur Zakirov (FC Spartak Anapa)

17 goals

 Andranik Babayan (FC Lokomotiv Mineralnye Vody)
 Aliyar Ismailov (FC Anzhi-2 Kaspiysk)

16 goals

 Eduard Khachaturyan (FC Mozdok)
 Yuri Takliyev (FC Nart Cherkessk)

15 goals

 Andrei Podgurskiy (FC Spartak Anapa)

Zone 2

Overview

Standings

Notes.

 FC Istochnik Rostov-on-Don were excluded from the league after playing 14 games and gaining 30 points. All their results were discarded. They did not play in any national-level competitions in 1997.
 FC Salyut-YuKOS Belgorod and FC Lokomotiv Yelets awarded 1 home win each.
 FC Salyut Belgorod renamed to FC Salyut-YuKOS.
 FC Dynamo-Zhemchuzhina-2 Sochi played their first professional season.
 FC Avangard-Kolos Taganrog and FC Chernomorets-d Novorossiysk played their first professional season. They did not play in any national-level competitions in 1997.
 FC Zvezda Gorodishche did not play in any national-level competitions in 1997.
 FC Izumrud Timashyovsk promoted from the Amateur Football League.
 FC Rostselmash-d Rostov-on-Don did not play professionally in 1995.

Top goalscorers 

32 goals

 Stanislav Dubrovin (FC Dynamo-Zhemchuzhina-2 Sochi)

20 goals

 Aleksandr Bocharnikov (FC Kuban Slavyansk-na-Kubani)
 Igor Stasyuk (FC Izumrud Timashyovsk)

15 goals

 Oleg Akulov (FC Zhemchuzhina-d Sochi)

14 goals

 Yevgeni Kuzka (FC Lokomotiv Yelets)

13 goals

 Sergei Borodin (FC Zvezda Gorodishche)
 Vladimir Grishchenko (FC Niva Slavyansk-na-Kubani / FC Chernomorets-d Novorossiysk)
  Manuk Kakosyan (FC Dynamo-Zhemchuzhina-2 Sochi)
 Sergei Sedov (FC Avangard-Kolos Taganrog)

12 goals

 Andrei Fomichyov (FC Salyut-YuKOS Belgorod)
 Tatul Mkhitaryan (FC Dynamo Mikhaylovka)
 Andrei Pakhtusov (FC Niva Slavyansk-na-Kubani)
 Aleksandr Shtyn (FC Zhemchuzhina-d Sochi)
 Yuri Veretin (FC Lokomotiv Yelets)

Zone 3

Overview

Standings

Notes.

 FC TRASKO Moscow were excluded from the league after playing 18 games and gaining 7 points. All their results were discarded.
 FC Mashinostroitel Sergiyev Posad awarded 1 home win.
 FC Dynamo-d Moscow was not promoted as reserve teams were not eligible for promotion.
 FC Torpedo-d Moscow renamed to FC Torpedo-Luzhniki-d.
 FC Roda Moscow promoted from the Amateur Football League.
 FC Obninsk did not play professionally in 1995 and did not play in any national-level competitions in 1997.

Top goalscorers 

25 goals

 Sergei Artyomov (FC Dynamo-d Moscow)
 Sergei Bespalykh (FC Avangard-Kortek Kolomna)

19 goals

 Igor Reutov (FC Avtomobilist Noginsk)

18 goals

 Anatoli Balaluyev (FC Avtomobilist Noginsk)

17 goals

 Aleksandr Samorodov (FC Mosenergo Moscow)

16 goals

 Nikolai Klikin (FC Dynamo-2 Moscow)

15 goals

 Aleksandr Kuptsov (FC Fabus Bronnitsy)

14 goals

 Sergei Burtsev (FC Torgmash Lyubertsy)
 Andrei Dyomkin (FC Dynamo-d Moscow)
 Konstantin Kaynov (FC Fabus Bronnitsy)

Zone 4

Overview

Standings

Notes.

 FC Karelia-Erzi Petrozavodsk were excluded from the league after playing 24 games and gaining 24 points. Opponents were awarded a win in the remaining games. They did not play professionally in 1995 and did not play in any national-level competitions in 1997
 FC Trion-Volga Tver renamed to FC Volga.
 FC Lokomotiv-d St. Petersburg played their first professional season.
 FC Spartak Bryansk promoted from the Amateur Football League.
 FC Kristall Dyatkovo and FC Bulat Cherepovets did not play in any national-level competitions in 1997.

Top goalscorers 

18 goals

 Vladislav Khakhalev (FC Torpedo Vladimir)

15 goals

 Ruslan Usikov (FC Dynamo Bryansk)

14 goals

 Igor Aksyonov (FC Neftyanik Yaroslavl)
 Valeri Korneyev (FC Spartak Bryansk)

13 goals

  Sergey Ulezlo (FC Volga Tver)

11 goals

 Aleksei Barikov (FC Oryol)
 Pavel Sukhov (FC Orekhovo Orekhovo-Zuyevo)

10 goals

 Igor Varakin (FC Orekhovo Orekhovo-Zuyevo)

9 goals

 Stanislav Borisov (FC Oryol)

8 goals

 Yevgeni Leonov (FC Karelia-Erzi Petrozavodsk)
 Andrei Syomin (FC Oryol)
 Konstantin Taptov (FC Spartak Bryansk)

Zone 5

Overview

Standings

Notes.

 FC Energetik Uren and FC Lokomotiv-d Nizhny Novgorod played their first professional season.
 FC Biokhimik-Mordovia Saransk promoted from the Amateur Football League where it played in 1995 as FC Biokhimik Saransk.
 FC Stroitel Morshansk and FC Iskra Engels promoted from the Amateur Football League.
 FC Kraneks Ivanovo did not play in any national-level competitions in 1997.

Top goalscorers 
25 goals

 Aleksandr Khalzov (FC Spartak Tambov)

19 goals

 Sergei Pervushin (FC Spartak Tambov)

15 goals

 Vladimir Nosov (FC Kristall Sergach)

14 goals

 Dmitri Borisko (FC Volga Ulyanovsk)
 Andrei Eskov (FC Iskra Engels)

12 goals

 Boris Goncharov (FC Spartak Tambov)
 Vladimir Kopylov (FC Druzhba Yoshkar-Ola)

11 goals

 Aleksandr Fyodorov (FC Progress Zelenodolsk)

10 goals

 Eduard Bazarov (FC Volga Balakovo)
 Sergei Glazunov (FC Salyut Saratov)
 Yuri Plyaskevich (FC Stroitel Morshansk)
 Vladimir Rokunov (FC Biokhimik-Mordovia Saransk)

Zone 6

Overview

Standings

Notes.

 FC Gornyak-Vanadiy Kachkanar renamed to FC Gornyak. Gornyak was excluded from the league after playing 12 games and gaining 22 points. Opponents were awarded a win in the remaining games.
 FC Dynamo Perm awarded 1 home win.
 FC Planeta Bugulma renamed to FC Neftyanik.
 FC Dynamo-Gazovik-d Tyumen, FC Gornyak Kushva and FC Uralmash-d Yekaterinburg did not play in any national-level competitions in 1997.

Top goalscorers 
13 goals

 Konstantin Ilyinykh (FC Dynamo Perm)

12 goals

 Aleksei Alekseyev (FC Uralets Nizhny Tagil)
 Yuri Petrov (FC Dynamo Perm)

11 goals

 Sergei Balandin (FC Metiznik Magnitogorsk)

9 goals

 Sergei Afanasyev (FC Metiznik Magnitogorsk)
 Igor Degtyaryov (FC Gazovik Orenburg)
 Albert Gubaydulin (FC Sodovik Sterlitamak)
 Dmitri Zakharov (FC Gornyak Kachkanar)

8 goals

 Vyacheslav Khovanskiy (FC Trubnik Kamensk-Uralsky)
 Yuri Panov (FC Sodovik Sterlitamak)
 Andrei Sviridov (FC Metiznik Magnitogorsk)
 Yuri Vetlugayev (FC Uralets Nizhny Tagil)

See also
1996 Russian Top League
1996 Russian First League
1996 Russian Second League

1996
4
Russia
Russia